The 1868 United States presidential election in New Hampshire took place on November 3, 1868, as part of the 1868 United States presidential election. Voters chose five representatives, or electors to the Electoral College, who voted for president and vice president.

New Hampshire voted for the Republican nominee, Ulysses S. Grant, over the Democratic nominee, Horatio Seymour. Grant won the state by a margin of 10.46%.

Results

See also
 United States presidential elections in New Hampshire

References

New Hampshire
1868
1868 New Hampshire elections